is a Japanese-American composer, conductor, and clarinetist. He is a recipient of several international prizes and honors. He currently resides in the United States. In 2018 he won a Guggenheim Fellowship and is currently Assistant Conductor of the New Music Ensemble at the University of Missouri School of Music.

Education
In 2000 he entered the Conservatory of Music at the University of the Pacific, studying composition and clarinet, graduating in 2004.  Between 2005 and 2008 he did his graduate studies in music composition at Yale University.   In February 2015 he received his doctorate from Columbia University, where his principal teachers have been Fabien Lévy, Tristan Murail and Fred Lerdahl.

Awards

 Fromm Commission (2018) 

 Guggenheim Fellowship (2018) 
 Civitella Ranieri Foundation Fellowship (2012) 
 Gaudeamus International Composers Award (2011)

Onishi as a composer
Onishi’s music has been in part characterized by the engineering of timbres.  In his 2009 work for string quartet, Culs-de-sac (en passacaille), he employs varieties of extended techniques for the string instruments.  Anthony Tommasini of the New York Times said of the piece: “Who needs electronic instruments when a composer can draw such varied, eerily alluring sounds from good old string instruments?”.

Onishi’s works have been commissioned by performers and organizations including Mayumi Miyata, Pacific Music Festival, Norfolk and Lucerne Festivals.  His composition, Départ dans… was commissioned by Takefu International Music Festival in 2010, and became the winning piece of the Gaudeamus Prize in Music Composition in 2011.

Performance organizations, including JACK Quartet, Quatuor Diotima, Yarn/Wire, Nieuw Ensemble, Ensemble Intercontemporain, and Klangforum Wien have performed Onishi’s works.

Since 2014, Onishi's works are published by Edition Gravis Verlag.

Works
The following is a partial list of works.

 Gz III (2019–20), for bass clarinet and bassoon
 Second String Quartet (2019–20)
 Antefenas-Studies (2018), for ensemble and electronics
 Vgf II (2011), for 15 players
 Gz, a Vuza Canon (2017), for tenor recorder and shakuhachi
 Envoi II (2017), for string trio
 Tramespace (2012–15), diptych for large ensemble
 Palinody (2010), for 14 players in 7 groups
 Départ dans... (2010), for 5 players
 Culs-de-sac (en passacaille) (2009, rev. 2010/18), for string quartet

Onishi as a conductor
Onishi is currently an assistant conductor of the Mizzou New Music Ensemble at the University of Missouri School of Music in Columbia, Missouri.  Previously he was an assistant conductor of the Columbia University Orchestra until 2013.   He is also affiliated with New York-based percussion ensemble Iktus Percussion as a conductor of the Iktus+.  He has also guest conducted several ensembles, including the Wet Ink Ensemble.

References

External links
 Official Website
 Onishi's Page on Columbia Composers
  Interview by Radio 4, The Netherlands
 National Public Radio: “JACK Quartet and ICE, In Concert At (Le) Poisson Rouge”
 Gaudeamus Muziekweek 2011 Jury Report
 Onishi's Vimeo Site
 Onishi's Soundcloud Site

1981 births
21st-century clarinetists
21st-century classical composers
21st-century conductors (music)
21st-century Japanese composers
21st-century Japanese male musicians
Gaudeamus Composition Competition prize-winners
Japanese classical clarinetists
Japanese classical composers
Japanese conductors (music)
Japanese male classical composers
Columbia University alumni
Living people
Musicians from Hokkaido
University of Missouri School of Music faculty